The Point was a Canadian radio program, which aired weekday afternoons on CBC Radio One. Hosted by Aamer Haleem, the program presented a mix of current affairs and lifestyle interviews and panel discussions.

Each day's episode also featured two guest "Point People", who participated with Haleem in further discussion on the topics raised by the program's main segments. Point People featured on the show have included journalists Jacqueline Hennessy, Fiona Forbes, Michael Hlinka, Sharon McLeod, Simi Sara and Victor Dwyer, political strategist Tasha Kheiriddin, writers Kevin Patterson and Heather Mallick,  and Sarnia mayor Mike Bradley.

The Point was cancelled by the CBC after one season as part of cost-cutting measures. Its final show aired on 26 June 2009.

References

External links
 The Point

CBC Radio One programs
Canadian talk radio programs
2008 radio programme debuts
2009 disestablishments in Canada